Ed Hughes (1927–2000) was  American football player and coach.

Ed Hughes may also refer to:

 Ed Hughes (actor), English actor in This House (play)
 Ed Hughes (anchor) (1938–2004), former news anchor in Norfolk, Virginia
 Ed Hughes (baseball) (1880–1927), baseball player
 Ed Hughes (composer) (born 1968), British composer

See also 
 Edward Hughes (disambiguation)
Eddie Hughes (disambiguation)